Jasmina "Jasna" Milosavljević (born February 13, 1958) is Yugoslavian and Serbian former female basketball player.

External links
Profile at mojacrvenazvezda.net

1958 births
Living people
Basketball players from Belgrade
Serbian women's basketball players
Yugoslav women's basketball players
Centers (basketball)
ŽKK Crvena zvezda players